Eucyclopera cypris is a moth of the subfamily Arctiinae first described by Herbert Druce in 1894. It is found in Mexico and Guatemala.

References

Nudariina